Sälen/Scandinavian Mountains Airport , also referred to as Sälen Trysil Airport, is an airport in the municipality of Malung-Sälen, Dalarna, Sweden, close to the Norwegian border.

History
The airport is intended for both scheduled and chartered services, primarily aimed at bringing tourists to the winter sports resorts of Sälen and Idre in Sweden, and Trysil in Norway. Before opening the nearest airports to the area were the local Mora Airport (113 km from Sälen/168 km from Trysil) and the large Oslo Airport (213 km from Sälen/171 km from Trysil).

The airport company Scandinavian Mountains Airport AB is owned by local companies, such as ski resort owners like SkiStar AB and municipal tourist promotion companies in both countries. In addition, in 2014, the Swedish government contributed SEK 250 million to the project, and the local counties and municipalities have also contributed money. Construction started in August 2017 with the runway paved in October 2018.
It opened on the 22 December 2019 and during the 2019-2020 winter it served 14,314 passengers. It was the first airport in the world designed to be operated from the outset with a virtual tower rather than a conventional air traffic control tower.
During the 2019-2020 winter season the Swedish airline BRA did operate with ATR72-600 and BAe RJ100 from Stockholm Bromma, Malmö, Ängelholm, Göteborg and Växjö.

Airlines and destinations
The following airlines operate regular scheduled and charter flights at Sälen/Scandinavian Mountains Airport:

Statistics

Terminal building 
The terminal building is 6,000 m2 and has four gates (no footbridges). There is a restaurant and a shop after the security check, and a vending machine café in the outer hall.

Ground transport
There are bus transfers to the ski resorts in connection with flights. The distance to the nearest one, Hundfjället is 10 km (6 mi) and the farthest in the Sälen area, Kläppen, . Taxis and car rental is available. Transfers to Sälen by dog sled or snowmobile is also available All ground transport should be pre-booked.

See also
 List of airports in Norway
 List of airports in Sweden

References

External links
 Official website
 Engelskmenn inntar skistedene (in Norwegian)

Airports in Sweden
Buildings and structures in Dalarna County
Tourism in Sweden
Airports established in 2019
2019 establishments in Sweden
International airports in Sweden